is an amusement park located near Tokyo in Tokorozawa, Saitama Prefecture. It is just outside the Seibuen-yūenchi Station, which is also owned and operated by the Seibu Railway. The park underwent a significant expansion and redesign for the 2021 season, focused around a Showa era themed marketplace, a Godzilla motion simulator attraction, and a children's area based on the work of Osamu Tezuka. Currently, an Ultraman attraction is in development for the 2023 season.

Attractions
Certain attractions are closed during rainy weather. The park charges a separate admittance fee for each attraction. However, a one-day free ticket is available, which includes admission and unlimited rides on most attractions.

In the evening, portions of the park are illuminated.

Notes

References

External links
 
 

Amusement parks in Japan
1950 establishments in Japan
Buildings and structures in Tokorozawa, Saitama
Seibu Group
Amusement parks opened in 1950